Kévin Le Roux (born 11 May 1989) is a French volleyball player, member of the France men's national volleyball team and German club Berlin Recycling Volleys, 2015 European Champion, two–time gold medallist of the World League (2015, 2017), Turkish Champion (2016).

Career

National team
In 2014 played at World Championship 2014 held in Poland.<ref>[http://poland2014.fivb.org/en/competition/teams/FRA-France France - team profile] - fivb.org</ref> France lost the match for the bronze medal with Germany and took 4th place. On October 18, 2015 French national team, including him, achieved title of the European Champion 2015 (3–0 with Slovenia in the finale).

Sporting achievements
Clubs
 CSV South American Club Championship
  Belo Horizonte 2019 – with Sada Cruzeiro
 National championships
 2013/2014  Italian Cup, with Copra Elior Piacenza
 2015/2016  Turkish SuperCup, with Halkbank Ankara
 2015/2016  Turkish Championship, with Halkbank Ankara
 2016/2017  Italian SuperCup, with Azimut Modena
 2018/2019  Brazilian Cup, with Sada Cruzeiro

Youth national team
 2006  CEV U20 European Championship
 2007  CEV U19 European Championship
 2008  CEV U20 European Championship

Individual awards
 2015: Turkish SuperCup – Most Valuable Player
 2017: FIVB World League – Best Middle Blocker
 2018: FIVB Nations League – Best Middle Blocker

References

External links
 Player profile at CEV.eu Player profile at LegaVolley.it 
 Player profile at LNV.fr Player profile at WorldofVolley.com Player profile at Volleybox.net'' 

1989 births
Living people
People from Champigny-sur-Marne
French men's volleyball players
French Champions of men's volleyball
Olympic volleyball players of France
Volleyball players at the 2016 Summer Olympics
French expatriate sportspeople in Italy
Expatriate volleyball players in Italy
French expatriate sportspeople in South Korea
Expatriate volleyball players in South Korea
French expatriate sportspeople in Turkey
Expatriate volleyball players in Turkey
French expatriate sportspeople in Russia
Expatriate volleyball players in Russia
French expatriate sportspeople in Brazil
Expatriate volleyball players in Brazil
French expatriate sportspeople in China
Expatriate volleyball players in China
French expatriate sportspeople in Germany
Expatriate volleyball players in Germany
Cheonan Hyundai Capital Skywalkers players
Halkbank volleyball players
Modena Volley players
Middle blockers
Opposite hitters